Zaziwa is a talk show broadcast on SABC1 channel in South Africa. It was hosted by Pearl Modiadie.

Summary
The show invites accomplished South African Television personalities to share the music that helped shape their life. The show airs every Sunday at 20:30 on SABC 1.

Guests

Season 1
Melusi Yeni
Rebecca Malope
Somizi Mhlongo
Kgomotso Christopher
Robert Marawa
Motlatsi Mafatshe
Mlangeni Nawa
Bonang Matheba
Bonnie Henna
Salamina Mosese
Thapelo Mokoena
Zizo Beda
DJ Cleo
Lerato Kganyago
Thembsie Matu
Gabriel Temudzani
Brenda Ngxoli
Luthuli Dlamini
Mzwandile Ngubeni
Atandwa Kani
Mandla Gaduka
Tumi Morake
Aaron Moloisi
Luthando Shosha
Andile Ncube
Deborah Fraser
Hlubi Mboya
DJ Fresh
Azania Mosaka
Anga Makubalo
Chichi Letswalo
Nondumiso Tembe
Zenande Mfenyana
Zola
Amanda Du-Pont
Black Coffee
AKA
Ronnie Nyakale
Zindzi Mandela
Spikiri
Yvonne Chaka Chaka
KCi
Siphokazi January
Mpho Maboi
Mshoza
Dr Malinga
Sthandwa Nzuza
Dr Mthokozisi Shongwe (Surprise Guest)
Thembalethu Mncube
Ms. Cunningham (Surprise Guest)
Sifiso Ncwane

Season 2
Maggie Benedict
DJ Sbu
DJ Euphonik
Lorna Maseko
Xoli Zondi
Lebo Motsoeli
Robbie Malinga
Hlelo & Ntando Masina
Seputla Sebogodi
Sinazo Yolwa
Zikhona Sodlaka
Fikile Moeti
Thembi Seete
Noluthando Meje
Siyabonga Radebe
HHP
Bujy Bikwa
Mzambiya
L'vovo Derrango
Chomee
Warren Masemola
Zuluboy
Thembisile Ntaka
JR
DJ Sbu
Vicki Karras (Surprise Guest)
Lundi Tyamara
Kutloano Modise	 (Surprise Guest)
Mandy Lachenicht
Zanele Nyakale-Peterson
Pitch Black Afro
Kenny Lattimore
Amon Mokoena
Simba Mhere
Gayton McKenzie
Portia Modise
Mi Casa
DJ Tira
Brian Temba
Joyce Chauke
Marietjie Bothma

Season 3
Ntokozo Dlamini
Bongani M
Khaya Dladla

References

South African television series